Brisco (or Briscoe) was a small town in Pine Township, Warren County, in the U.S. state of Indiana.  It began in the 1850s and gained a one-room school in 1856, which operated until 1929.  In 1930 the school building became a general store run for more than 50 years by local resident Jim Marquess.  Never more than a tiny hamlet, Brisco almost entirely disappeared during the 20th century and now no longer appears on county maps, though the USGS cites it, and a cemetery northeast of town still bears the name.

Geography 
Brisco is located along Old US 41, about a quarter mile east of the intersection of County Road 650 North with U.S. Route 41 and roughly 9 miles north-northwest of the county seat of Williamsport.  Mud Pine Creek flows just east of the site.

References 

 Warren County Historical Society. A History of Warren County, Indiana (175th Anniversary Edition) (2002).

Former populated places in Warren County, Indiana
Former populated places in Indiana